2018 hurricane season may refer to any of the following tropical cyclone seasons

2018 Atlantic hurricane season
2018 Pacific hurricane season
2018 Pacific typhoon season
2018 North Indian Ocean cyclone season
2017–18 South-West Indian Ocean cyclone season
2018–19 South-West Indian Ocean cyclone season
2017–18 Australian region cyclone season
2018–19 Australian region cyclone season
2017–18 South Pacific cyclone season
2018–19 South Pacific cyclone season